Government Degree College, Kanchanpur, is a general degree college in Kanchanpur, Tripura. It offers undergraduate courses in arts and sciences. It is affiliated to  Tripura University.

Departments

Science
Computer Science and Engineering

Arts
Bengali
English
Kokborok
History
Political Science
Philosophy
Education

Accreditation
The college is recognized by the University Grants Commission (UGC).

See also
Education in India
Education in Tripura
Tripura University
Literacy in India
List of institutions of higher education in Tripura

References

External links
http://www.gdck.ac.in/

Colleges affiliated to Tripura University
Educational institutions established in 2012
Universities and colleges in Tripura
2012 establishments in Tripura
Colleges in Tripura